Gene Sequencing may refer to: 
 DNA sequencing
 or a comprehensive variant of it: Whole genome sequencing